Veritas is an American classical crossover vocal quintet who started making music in 2012 and have released one album, Veritas, through the Fair Trade Services label.  The album contains a variety of traditional repertoire, musical theater, pop, and a few original pieces.

Members
 Jeff Anderson - tenor
 James Berrian - baritone
 Andrew Goodwin - tenor
 Jordan Johnson - tenor
 Lucas Scott Lawrence - bass

Songs
 "Agnus Dei Medley"
 "You'll Never Walk Alone"
 "Dare You to Move"
 "Love Of My Life"
 "I Can Only Imagine"
 "The Hand That Holds The Storm"
 "American Anthology"
 "10,000 Reasons"
 "If You're Out There"
 "The Lord's Prayer"

Discography

References

Fair Trade Services artists